Gunda aroa is a species of moth in the family Bombycidae. It was described by George Thomas Bethune-Baker in 1904. It is found in New Guinea.

The wingspan is about 55 mm. The forewings are blackish brown, the costa ochreous grey to beyond the cell and the medial area with a brownish tinge. The hindwings are blackish, with the apex and termen brown to near the inner angle.

References

Moths described in 1904
Bombycidae